is a railway station located in the city of Kamagaya, Chiba Prefecture, Japan, operated by the Shin-Keisei Electric Railway.

Lines
Hatsutomi Station is served by the Shin-Keisei Line, and is located 13.3 kilometers from the terminus of the line at Matsudo Station.

Layout 
The station consists of two opposite side platforms serving two tracks, with they station building underneath.

Platforms

History
It assumed its present name on April 1, 1955.

Passenger statistics
In fiscal 2017, the station was used by an average of 2690 passengers daily.

Surrounding area
Kamagaya City Hall
Kamagaya Middle School
Kamagaya Elementary School

See also
 List of railway stations in Japan

References

External links

 Shin Keisei Railway Station information  

Railway stations in Japan opened in 1949
Railway stations in Chiba Prefecture
Kamagaya